Ross Warner (10 November 1943 – 1 August 2020) was an Australian rugby league footballer who played in the 1960s and 1970s.

Playing career
Originally from Tamworth, New South Wales, Warner was given a contract by North Sydney in 1963. 

He replaced club stalwart Norm Strong to become Norths hooker for the next twelve seasons. Warner represented New South Wales on three occasions and captained North Sydney towards the end of his career. Warner retired at the end of the 1974 NSWRFL season.

Accolades
In 2007, Warner was named in the North Sydney team of the century at hooker.

References

1943 births
2020 deaths
North Sydney Bears players
Australian rugby league players
New South Wales rugby league team players
City New South Wales rugby league team players
Rugby league hookers
People from Tamworth, New South Wales
Rugby league players from New South Wales